Les Nuls (also known as ABCD Nuls) was a French group of comedians appearing between 1987 and 1992 on the channel Canal+. The actors Alain Chabat, Dominique Farrugia, Chantal Lauby and Bruno Carette (who died in 1989) played many parodies and humoristic episodes.

External links

French satirical television shows
1987 French television series debuts
Self-reflexive television
French parodists
French comedy television series
1980s French television series
1990s French television series